The 2021 League of Ireland First Division season was the 37th season of the League of Ireland First Division, the second tier of Ireland's association football league. The fixture list was released on 8 February 2021 and the competition commenced on 26 March 2021. Shelbourne were confirmed Champions and promoted to the League of Ireland Premier Division on 1 October 2021.

Overview
The First Division has 10 teams. Each team plays each other three times for a total of 27 matches in the season.

Teams

Team changes
Shelbourne and Cork City joined following their relegation from the Premier League at the end of the 2020 season.  Drogheda United and Longford Town departed following their promotion from the 2020 First Division.

Additional teams
On 10 November 2020 a newly formed Limerick based club Treaty United announced that they would apply for a 2021 League of Ireland licence.    Former Dublin based League of Ireland club St Francis FC and Wexford based Yola FC also both expressed interest in joining for 2021 by the deadline for expressions of interest which was 10 November 2020. An application was made by a brand new entity under the name Dublin County F.C. but did not ultimately materialise.  Bray Wanderers and Cabinteely F.C. merged at the end of the season, keeping the name Bray Wanderers.

Stadia and locations

Personnel and kits

Note: Flags indicate national team as has been defined under FIFA eligibility rules. Players may hold more than one non-FIFA nationality.

Managerial changes

League table

Results

Matches 1–18
Teams play each other twice (once at home, once away). 

*Note Cabinteely v Galway Utd postponed on 9 April 2021 (Galway awarded a 3-0 victory by FAI).

Matches 19-27

Season statistics

Top scorers

As of matches played 29 October 2021.

Play-offs

First Division play-off Semi-finals

First leg

Second leg

First Division play-off Final

Promotion/relegation play-off

See also
 2021 League of Ireland Premier Division
 2021 FAI Cup

References

 
League of Ireland First Division seasons
2021 League of Ireland
2
Ireland
Ireland